"I Wanna Rock" is the third official single from American rapper, Snoop Dogg's tenth studio album, Malice n Wonderland. It was released digitally on iTunes on November 17, 2009, after the second single "That's Tha Homie". The song was produced by Scoop DeVille and mixed by Dr. Dre, and Snoop Dogg released it on a mixtape titled "I Wanna Rock" on November 23. The song was confirmed by BBC Radio 1 to be released in the UK on March 15, 2010 but is now listed as "Coming Soon".

The lines "Right about now" and "I wanna rock right now" as well as the beat are sampled from Rob Base and DJ E-Z Rock's 1988 song "It Takes Two."   The main sample is from "Space Dust" by Galactic Force Band. The song features no production from Dr. Dre, but was mixed by him. The beat was produced by Scoop DeVille

Music video
The music video (directed by Erick Peyton) premiered on MTV Hits and MTV.com on November 26, 2009. It features Jamie Foxx, America's Best Dance Crew season 3 winners Quest Crew, Hip-Hop Group Far East Movement, professional skateboarder Terry Kennedy, Laurie Ann Gibson, and popular Jerkin' crew The Ranger$. The video takes place during an alley dance battle and Snoop rapping on top of a roof.

Track listing

Charts

Weekly charts

Year-end charts

Remixes 

The official remix features Jay-Z and is referred to as "The Kings' G-Mix." The music video was released to YouTube through Snoop Dogg's official channel on March 25, 2010. The video has Jay-Z's vocals but he is not physically in the video Sometimes the Ludacris freestyle is added to the original or The Kings' G-Mix" on the radio as the remix. It features a vocal sample of "Microphone Fiend" by Eric B. & Rakim in Snoop Doggs new verse. It is the 1st track on the album's re-release, entitled More Malice.

The 2nd official remix has surfaced known as the "Interstate Trafficking Remix", and it features Roscoe Dash on the chorus, Rick Ross, Maino, OJ da Juiceman and Yo Gotti. It is produced by DJ Green Lantern with a whole different beat and a new verse by Snoop Dogg. It was leaked on February 15, 2010.

The 3rd official remix features Kardinal Offishall. It is known as the "TO Remix", and it has a new intro by Snoop Dogg.

The 4th official remix is the "Travis Barker Remix". It is the 2nd bonus track on the album's re-release, entitled More Malice.

Other remixes have been released, the "West Coast Remix", which features Tha Dogg Pound, Crooked I, Ras Kass and Nipsey Hussle., as well as the release of a "Queens Remix" featuring Lil' Kim and Lady of Rage. In addition, multiple rappers have freestyled over the beat, including:

 Yelawolf
 Ludacris
 Raekwon
 Kano
 Fat Joe
 Rock City
 Joell Ortiz
 Adil Omar
 Ras Kass
 Styles P
 Busta Rhymes
 Crooked I
 Cassidy
 Young Jeezy
 Tha Dogg Pound
 Bow Wow
 Nipsey Hussle
 Red Cafe
 Bun B
 Nu Jerzey Devil
 Juelz Santana
 Ace Hood
 Lil' Rob
 Trey Songz
 Tyga
 Sway
 Slick Rick
 Lil' Kim
 Jae Millz
 Lloyd Banks
 Chris Brown
 Jay Z

References

2009 singles
Snoop Dogg songs
Songs written by Dr. Dre
Songs written by Snoop Dogg
Song recordings produced by Scoop DeVille
2009 songs
Songs written by Scoop DeVille
Songs written by Jay-Z
Songs written by James Brown
Song recordings produced by Dr. Dre
Priority Records singles